Maan (or Mann) is an Indian surname used by the Jat people in the sates of Punjab and Haryana.

Notable people with the surname
Amitoj Maan, Indian actor, director, author and screenwriter
Amrit Maan, Indian singer-songwriter and actor
Babbu Maan, Indian singer-songwriter, actor and producer
Babu Singh Maan (born 1942), Indian musician and songwriter
Baj Maan (born 2000), Canadian soccer player
Bashir Maan (1926–2019), Pakistani-British politician, businessman and writer
Behice Maan (1882–1969), Ottoman noble and twelfth wife of Sultan Abdul Hamid II
Gurdas Maan (born 1957), Indian singer-songwriter, choreographer and actor
Manjeet Maan, Indian film producer and director
Nabyla Maan (born 1987), Moroccan singer-songwriter
Saad Maan (born 1972), Iraqi politician and military officer
Sandeep Singh Maan (born 1993), Indian Paralympic sprinter and long jumper
Sujeet Maan (born 1978), Indian wrestler
Zora Singh Maan (born 1940), Indian politician

See also
Mann (surname)

References

Indian surnames
Surnames of Indian origin
Jat clans of Punjab
Punjabi-language surnames
Sikh communities
Hindu surnames
Toponymic surnames
Arabic-language surnames
Surnames of Syrian origin
Surnames of Iraqi origin
Surnames of Pakistani origin
Dutch toponymic surnames